HMS Drake was a member of the standardized 20-gun sixth rates built at the end of the 17th Century. After commissioning she was lost within three months on the Irish Coast in a storm on 20 December 1694.

Drake was the second named vessel since it was used for a 16-gun vessel launched at Deptford in 1653 and sold at Jamaica in 1691.

Construction
She was ordered in the Second Batch of eight ships to be built under contract from George Fowler of Rotherhithe. She was launched on 26 September 1694.

Commissioned Service
She was commissioned on 26 September 1694 under the command of Captain John Stapleton, RN.

Loss
HMS Drake was wrecked with the loss of all hands on the Irish Coast in a storm on 20 December 1694.

Citations

References
 Winfield, British Warships in the Age of Sail (1603 – 1714), by Rif Winfield, published by Seaforth Publishing, England © 2009, EPUB , Chapter 6, The Sixth Rates, Vessels acquired from 18 December 1688, Sixth Rates of 20 guns and up to 26 guns, Maidstone Group, Drake
 Colledge, Ships of the Royal Navy, by J.J. Colledge, revised and updated by Lt Cdr Ben Warlow and Steve Bush, published by Seaforth Publishing, Barnsley, Great Britain, © 2020, e  (EPUB), Section D (Drake)

 

1690s ships
Corvettes of the Royal Navy
Naval ships of the United Kingdom
Ships built in England